Geoffrey Baron may refer to:
Geoffrey Baron (priest), Australian dean
Geoffrey Baron (rebel) (1607–1651), Irish rebel
Jeff Baron, American playwright and screenwriter

See also

Geoffrey Barron (disambiguation)